Brodick (("Castle Beach") or Breadhaig) is the main village on the Isle of Arran, in the Firth of Clyde, Scotland. It is halfway along the east coast of the island, in Brodick Bay below Goat Fell, the tallest mountain on Arran. The name is derived from the Norse "breda-vick" meaning "Broad Bay".

The harbour receives the main ferry between Arran and the mainland via Ardrossan. Brodick Castle is a former residence of the Dukes of Hamilton.

Brodick is one of the largest villages on the island and is seen as the main hub due to the ferry terminal which connects the island to the mainland. It is host to many homes, hotels and shops, the health centre, nursing home, heritage museum, tourist information centre, Brodick Castle, public beach, park and an 18-hole golf course.

Transport 
Brodick has Arran's main ferry terminus, which occasionally connects Brodick to Ardrossan on the mainland and to the national rail network. The ferries are operated by Caledonian MacBrayne.  serves the island year-round, with  providing additional sailings during the summer. The crossing takes less than one hour. The route is one of the busiest crossings on the CalMac network, and dolphins and basking sharks are rarely spotted en route. A second, smaller ferry –  – sails from Lochranza to Claonaig on the Kintyre peninsula between March and October.

The village has seen investment recently with £30M being spent on the new Brodick Ferry Terminal.  This is a new larger passenger terminal with a larger pier capable of handling two large vessels at once, increasing capacity on Scotland's busiest ferry route which handled 828,262 passengers and 202,843 cars in 2016 up 8.7% and 6.8% respectively.

In addition to the new ferry terminal, which was formally opened by Derek Mackay MSP on 12 April 2018, the island is expected to get a new dual-fuelled ferry built on the River Clyde for around £45m. The ferry has been named  after a public vote in Spring 2017, and the ferry is expected to be delivered in early 2019. Unfortunately this deadline has been delayed, and it is unknown when it will enter service.

The village is connected to all parts of the island by road including Lamlash and Whiting Bay to the south, Lochranza to the north and Blackwaterfoot to the west.

A new upgraded bus terminal opened in Brodick at the new ferry terminal in early 2017, and is a hub for transport on the island, providing many bus services.

Village 
Brodick is a popular holiday destination and a base for hill-walking. Tourism provides much of the village's economic base. There are many family-owned and independent businesses, such as hotels, restaurants, shops, bed and breakfast establishments, guest houses and outdoor activities. There is also a brewery (located in nearby Cladach), a sports and leisure complex, and an 18-hole golf course. 

The village of Brodick is the largest settlement on the island (although Lamlash has a larger population), and is seen as the centre of economic activity due to the many businesses that are located around the village. These include the 22 bedroom Douglas Hotel & Bar, and the Auchrannie Spa and Resort, which comprises two 4-star hotels with 85 rooms and thirty 5-star self-catering lodges along with a spa, two leisure centres, and adventure company and more on site.
The village is also the home of Arran Haulage and Arran Aromatics, as well as many more small independent businesses.

Brodick has a primary school, village hall, library, church, sports park, health centre and public beach, and is the main shopping base on the island. Brodick has a large Co-op supermarket in the village, as well as a smaller Co-op convenience store at Invercloy. There are also hairdressers, estate agents, the post office, gift shops, bakers, chocolate shop, bike hire store, and numerous cafes, bars and restaurants, most notably Crofters, Douglas Bistro, Ormidale Bar, Brodick Bar and The Auchrannie Resort which has three restaurants and bars; Brambles - Seafood & Grill, Cruize - Bar/Brasserie and Eighteen69 - Scottish Tapas. Brodick is also home to Brodick Golf Club, which has 18 holes.

The largest peak on the island, Goat Fell, overlooks the village and Brodick Bay.

Brodick Castle 

Brodick Castle was previously a seat of the Dukes of Hamilton, but is now owned by the National Trust for Scotland. The castle itself will be closed for 2 years until 2018/2019 for refurbishment by NTS, however the grounds will be open throughout. A new Kids adventure section of the park opened in July 2017.

References

External links

Canmore - Arran, Brodick, General site record
Canmore - Brodick, Rosaburn, Arran Heritage Museum, Rosaburn House site record

Villages in the Isle of Arran
Ports and harbours of Scotland
Firth of Clyde